Franziska Christina Brigitte Hoppermann ( Bartels, born 8 January 1982) is a German civil servant and politician of the Christian Democratic Union (CDU) who has been serving as a member of the Bundestag since the 2021 elections, representing the Hamburg-Wandsbek district.

Political career

Career in state politics
Ahead of the 2020 state elections, CDU candidate Marcus Weinberg included Hoppermann in his shadow cabinet for the party's campaign to unseat First Mayor of Hamburg Peter Tschentscher.

Member of the German Parliament, 2021–present
Hoppermann became a member of the German Bundestag in the 2021 national elections, representing the Hamburg-Wandsbek district. In parliament, she has since been serving on the Committee on Digital Affairs and the Budget Committee's Subcommmittee on European Affairs.

Ahead of the Christian Democrats' leadership election in 2022, Hoppermann publicly endorsed Norbert Röttgen to succeed Armin Laschet as the party's chair and joined his campaign team.

Personal life
Hoppermann is married and has a son. Her grandfather Carl Damm sat in the Hamburg Parliament and was also a Member of the Bundestag.

References 

Living people
1982 births
Members of the Bundestag 2021–2025
Members of the Bundestag for the Christian Democratic Union of Germany
Members of the Bundestag for Hamburg
21st-century German politicians
21st-century German women politicians
Female members of the Bundestag